The Chesapeake & Ohio Railway Station is a railway depot located in Pioneer Park on West Lake Street in Petoskey, Michigan. It was placed on the National Register of Historic Places in 1970. The building now houses the Little Traverse Historical Museum.

History
The Grand Rapids and Indiana Railroad began service to Petoskey in 1874, and was the only railroad in the area. In 1891, a second railroad, the Chicago and West Michigan Railway, began constructing a line with attendant buildings, between Elk Rapids and Petoskey. The railway purchased this land on the shore of Little Traverse Bay to place their Petoskey Depot. The company hired the Cadillac firm of Mosser and Wilson to construct the depot, and both the rail line and depot were completed in 1892. The town of Petoskey then created a park (now Pioneer Park) surrounding the depot.

In 1899, the Chicago and West Michigan Railway and this station was absorbed into the Pere Marquette Railway. The Pere Marquette (PM), in turn, was merged into the Chesapeake and Ohio Railway (C&O) in 1947. The PM, and later, the C&O, ran the Resort Special night train from Chicago, along with local trains on the route. The Petoskey station continued to serve passengers until the 1950s, when it was abandoned. The C&O ran passenger trains to Petoskey until some point between 1961 and 1963. In 1970, the Little Traverse Regional Historical Society obtained a lease on the depot and some of the surrounding land. The building was converted into a museum in 1971, and as of 2017 is used as the Little Traverse Historical Museum

Description
The Chesapeake and Ohio Depot is located just on the edge of Little Traverse Bay. It is a distinctly Victorian Shingle style building with a distinct Victorian cast. The long building originally had open platforms at each end, but these were filled in during subsequent renovations. A porte cochere extends in the front of the building, and perching atop the building is a squat conical roof. Next to the conical section is a tall narrow chimney.

References

External links
Little Traverse Historical Museum

Railway stations on the National Register of Historic Places in Michigan
Railway stations in the United States opened in 1892
Former railway stations in Michigan
Richardsonian Romanesque architecture in Michigan
Former Chesapeake and Ohio Railway stations
National Register of Historic Places in Emmet County, Michigan
Museums in Emmet County, Michigan
Petoskey